Lőrinc is a Hungarian given name. It is a cognate of English Laurence, a name derived from a form of the Latin Laurentius.

Lőrinc may refer to:

Lőrinc Galgóczi (born 1911), Hungarian field handball player, competed in the 1936 Summer Olympics
Lőrinc Szabó (1900–1957), Hungarian poet and literary translator
Lőrinc Wathay (died 1573), Hungarian nobleman and castellan of Csesznek

References

Hungarian masculine given names